The 1911 Buchtel football team represented Buchtel College in the 1911 college football season. The team was led by head coach Frank Haggerty, in his second season. Buchtel outscored their opponents by a total of 80–24.

Schedule

References

Buchtel
Akron Zips football seasons
Buchtel football